Dona Maria I (17 December 1734 – 20 March 1816) was Queen of Portugal from 24 February 1777 until her death in 1816. Known as Maria the Pious in Portugal and Maria the Mad in Brazil, she was the first undisputed queen regnant of Portugal and the first monarch of Brazil.

Maria was the eldest daughter of King Dom José I (Joseph I) of Portugal and Infanta Doña Mariana Victoria of Spain. As the heir to the throne, she held the titles of Princess of Brazil and Duchess of Braganza. She married her uncle Infante Dom Pedro (Peter) in 1760. They had six children, of whom three survived infancy: Dom José (Joseph), Prince of Brazil; King Dom João VI (John VI) of Portugal; and Infanta Mariana Vitória. The death of King José in 1777 placed Maria, then 42 years old, on the throne. Her husband Pedro was nominally king alongside her as Dom Pedro III.

Upon ascending the throne, Maria dismissed her father's powerful chief minister, Sebastião José de Carvalho e Melo, 1st Marquis of Pombal. The early part of Maria's reign witnessed growth in Portugal's economy. Maria had a number of national buildings constructed and renovated, leading to the completion of the Palace of Queluz and the inauguration of the Palace of Ajuda and other new monuments. The death of her husband in 1786, followed by the deaths in 1788 of her eldest son José and her confessor Inácio de São Caetano, caused the queen to develop clinical depression. Her second son, João, then served as prince regent. With Napoleon's European conquests, Maria and her court moved to the Portuguese colony of Brazil in 1807. After Brazil was elevated to a kingdom in 1815, Maria became Queen of the United Kingdom of Portugal, Brazil and the Algarves. Upon her death in 1816, her son succeeded her as King Dom João VI.

Early life

Maria was born at the Ribeira Palace in Lisbon and baptized Maria Francisca Isabel Josefa Antónia Gertrudes Rita Joana. She was the eldest of four daughters born to Dom José (Joseph), Prince of Brazil (later King Dom José I of Portugal), and Infanta Mariana Victoria of Spain. Her father José was the son of the reigning King Dom João V (John V) of Portugal and his wife Maria Anna of Austria. Her mother, Mariana Victoria, was the eldest daughter of King Don Felipe V (Philip V) of Spain and Queen Elisabeth Farnese. King João appointed his granddaughter Maria as the Princess of Beira on the day of her birth.

Maria's grandfather João V died on 31 July 1750. Her father, Prince José, then succeeded to the throne as Dom José I. As José's eldest child, Maria became his heir presumptive and was given the traditional titles of Princess of Brazil and Duchess of Braganza.

Influence of the Marquis of Pombal
 
King José's government was dominated completely by Sebastião José de Carvalho e Melo, 1st Marquis of Pombal. The king would often retire to the Palace of Queluz, which he later gave to his daughter, Princess Maria, and his brother and son-in-law, Infante Pedro (Peter). The Marquis of Pombal secured control of the government after the 1755 Lisbon earthquake, in which around 100,000 people lost their lives. The palace of Maria's birth was also destroyed in the disaster.

After the earthquake, King José was often uncomfortable at the thought of staying in enclosed spaces, and later experienced claustrophobia. The king had a palace built in Ajuda, away from the city centre. This palace became known as Real Barraca de Ajuda (Royal Hut at Ajuda) because it was made of wood. The family spent much time at the large palace. (The palace was the birthplace of Maria's first child, José, .) In 1794 the palace burned to the ground and the Palace of Ajuda was built in its place.

On 6 June 1760 Maria married the king's younger brother, her uncle Pedro (later King Dom Pedro III of Portugal). Maria and Pedro had six children: José, João Francisco, João (later King Dom João VI), Mariana Vitória, Maria Clementina, and Maria Isabel. Only José, João, and Mariana Vitória survived to adulthood. Maria also delivered a stillborn boy in 1762.

Reign

King José died on 24 February 1777. His daughter, Maria, then became the first undisputed queen regnant of Portugal. With Maria's accession, her husband became nominal king as Dom Pedro III, but the actual regal authority was vested solely in Maria, as she was the lineal heir of the crown. Also, as Pedro's kingship was jure uxoris only, his reign would cease in the event of Maria's death, and the crown would pass to Maria's descendants. However, Pedro predeceased his wife in 1786. Maria is considered to have been a good ruler in the period prior to her madness. Her first act as queen was to dismiss the popular secretary of state of the kingdom, the Marquis of Pombal, who had broken the power of the reactionary aristocracy via the Távora affair, partially because of his Enlightenment, anti-Jesuit policies. Noteworthy events of this period include Portugal's membership in the League of Armed Neutrality (July 1782) and the 1781 cession of Delagoa Bay from Austria to Portugal. However, the queen had religious mania and melancholia and this would take a toll on her health. This acute mental illness (perhaps due to porphyria) made her incapable of handling state affairs after 1792.

On January 5, 1785, the queen issued a charter imposing heavy restrictions on industrial activity in Brazil; how, for example, it prohibited the manufacture of fabrics and other products, extinguishing all textile manufactures in the colony, except the industry of coarse cloth for the use of slaves and workers; since the Portuguese colonial administration did not look favorably on the development of industrial activities in Brazil for fear of economic and, perhaps, political independence. During her reign, the trial, conviction and execution of ensign Joaquim José da Silva Xavier, known as Tiradentes, took place in 1789.

Mental deterioration

Maria's madness was first officially noticed in 1786, when she had to be carried back to her apartments in a state of delirium. Afterward, the queen's mental state became increasingly worse. On 25 May 1786, her husband died; Maria was devastated and forbade any court entertainments. According to a contemporary account, state festivities began to resemble religious ceremonies. The queen's eldest son and heir, Prince Dom José, died aged 27 from smallpox on 11 September 1788, and her confessor Inácio de São Caetano, Titular Archbishop of Salonica, died in November that year. These deaths may have resulted in Queen Maria developing major depressive disorder. Another potential cause was her incestuous ancestry; this is substantiated by two of her sisters having had similar conditions.

In February 1792, Maria was deemed insane and was treated by Francis Willis, the same physician who attended the British king George III. Willis wanted to take her to England, but the plan was refused by the Portuguese court. Potentially as a result of Willis' more advisory role in Maria's care, rather than the hands-on care of King George III, Willis deemed the queen incurable. Maria's second son, Dom João (John), now Prince of Brazil, took over the government in her name, even though he only took the title of Prince Regent in 1799. When the Real Barraca de Ajuda burnt down in 1794, the court was forced to move to Queluz, where the ill queen would lie in her apartments all day. Visitors would complain of terrible screams that would echo throughout the palace.

Napoleonic Wars 
 
In 1801 Spanish Prime Minister Manuel de Godoy sent an army to invade Portugal with backing from the French leader Napoleon, resulting in the War of the Oranges. Though the Spanish ended their invasion, the Treaty of Badajoz on 6 June 1801 forced Portugal to cede Olivença and other border towns to Spain. (This cession is not recognized by the present Portuguese government, and the country officially considers those territories still to be Portuguese possessions.) On 29 September 1801 Prince Dom João signed the Treaty of Madrid (1801), ceding half of Portuguese Guyana to France, which became French Guiana.

The refusal of the Portuguese government to join the French-sponsored Continental Blockade against Britain culminated in the late 1807 Franco-Spanish invasion of Portugal led by General Jean-Andoche Junot. The ultimate Napoleonic plan for Portugal was to split it into three sections. The northern parts of Portugal, from the Douro to the Minho, would become the Kingdom of Northern Lusitania, and its throne was promised to King Louis II of Etruria. The Alentejo Province and Kingdom of the Algarve would be merged to form the Principality of the Algarves, of which Manuel de Godoy would be sovereign. The remaining portion of Portugal would have been directly ruled by France.

Transfer to Brazil 

At the urging of the British government, the entire House of Braganza decided to flee on 29 November 1807 to establish a government in exile in the Portuguese Viceroyalty of Brazil. Along with the royal family, Maria was transported aboard the carrack Príncipe Real. During her move from the royal palace to the docks she was heard screaming throughout the trip, in the middle of the crowd and in the carriage. The queen's dementia was so great that she feared that she was going to be tortured or robbed during her movement by her servants.

In January 1808 Prince Regent João and his court arrived in Salvador da Bahia. Under pressure by local aristocracy and the British, the prince regent signed a commercial regulation after his arrival that opened commerce between Brazil and friendly nations, which in this case represented the interests of Great Britain above all. This law broke an important colonial pact that had previously allowed Brazil to maintain direct commercial relations only with Portugal.

On 1 August 1808 British General Arthur Wellesley (later Duke of Wellington) landed a British army in Lisbon to initiate the Peninsular War. The impact of Wellesley's initial victory over Junot at the Battle of Vimeiro (21 August 1808) was wiped out by his superiors in the Convention of Cintra (30 August 1808), which allowed the defeated French troops to evacuate peacefully from Portugal.

Wellesley (soon to be made Lord Wellington) returned to Portugal on 22 April 1809 to recommence the campaign. Portuguese forces under British command distinguished themselves in the defence of the Lines of Torres Vedras (1809–1810) and in the subsequent invasion of Spain and France. In 1815 Prince João's government elevated Brazil to the status of a kingdom, and Maria was proclaimed Queen of the United Kingdom of Portugal, Brazil and the Algarves. When Napoleon was finally defeated in 1815, Maria and her family remained in Brazil.

Death and legacy 

Maria lived in Brazil for a total of eight years, always in a state of incapacitation. In 1816, she died at the Carmo Convent in Rio de Janeiro at the age of 81. After her death, the prince regent was acclaimed as King Dom João VI. In 1821, Maria's body was returned to Lisbon to be interred in a mausoleum in the Estrela Basilica, which she had helped found.

Maria is a greatly admired figure in both Brazil and Portugal due to the tremendous changes and events that took place during her reign. In Portugal, she is celebrated as a strong female figure. Her legacy shines at Portugal's Queluz Palace, a baroque-roccoco masterpiece that she helped conceive. A large statue of her stands in front of the palace, and a pousada near the palace is named in her honour. A large marble statue of the queen was erected at the Portuguese National Library in Lisbon by the students of Joaquim Machado de Castro.

In Brazil, Maria is admired as a key figure in the eventual independence of Brazil. It was during her reign, albeit through the government of her son's regency, that many of the national institutions and organizations in Brazil were created. These institutions were the precursors to their modern-day equivalents and granted large degree of power to the Brazilian colonials. While she is often called A Louca (the Mad) in Brazil, Brazilian and Portuguese historians hold her in high esteem.

Marriage and issue 
Maria married her uncle Pedro on 6 June 1760. At the time of their marriage, Maria was 25 and Pedro was 42. Despite the age gap, the couple had a happy marriage. Upon Maria's accession in 1777, her husband became the nominal King Dom Pedro III of Portugal.

Ancestry

See also 
List of mentally ill monarchs

Notes

References

Bibliography
 
 Benevides, Francisco da Fonseca. Rainhas de Portugal: Estudo Historico - Volume I. Lisbon, Portugal: Typographia Castro Irmão.
 Benevides, Francisco da Fonseca. Rainhas de Portugal: Estudo Historico - Volume II. Lisbon, Portugal: Typographia Castro Irmão.

External links
 

|-

1734 births
1816 deaths
House of Braganza
Brazilian monarchs
Regents of Portugal
Regents of Brazil
Brazilian royalty
Queens regnant in Europe
Princesses of Brazil
Dukes of Braganza
Princes of Beira
Dukes of Barcelos
Portuguese infantas
Dames of the Order of Saint Isabel
3
3
3
Knights of the Order of Saint Stephen of Hungary
Knights of the Golden Fleece of Spain
People of the Peninsular War
18th-century Portuguese monarchs
19th-century Portuguese monarchs
18th-century women rulers
19th-century women rulers
People from Lisbon
Royalty and nobility with disabilities
Royal reburials